Xercès Louis (October 31, 1926 – 1978) was a French footballer who played as a midfielder. He won 12 caps for France between 1954 and 1956.

References

External links
 Profile

1926 births
1978 deaths
French footballers
France international footballers
Association football midfielders
Ligue 1 players
Ligue 2 players
Olympique Lyonnais players
RC Lens players
FC Girondins de Bordeaux players
1954 FIFA World Cup players
French football managers
FC Sète 34 managers
Martiniquais footballers
French people of Martiniquais descent
Black French sportspeople